Snurportin1 is a protein that in humans is encoded by the SNUPN gene.

The nuclear import of the spliceosomal snRNPs U1, U2, U4 and U5, is dependent on the presence of a complex nuclear localization signal. The latter is composed of the 5'-2,2,7-terminal trimethylguanosine (m3G) cap structure of the U snRNA and the Sm core domain. The protein encoded by this gene interacts specifically with m3G-cap and functions as an snRNP-specific nuclear import receptor. Alternatively spliced transcript variants encoding the same protein have been identified for this gene.

References

Further reading

External links